Shahrul Zaman bin Yahya is a Malaysian politician who was a member of the Perak State Executive Council (EXCO) in the Barisan Nasional (BN) state administration under former Menteri Besar Zambry Abdul Kadir from May 2013 to the collapse of the BN state administration in May 2018 and Perikatan Nasional (PN) state administration under former Menteri Besar Ahmad Faizal Azumu from March 2020 to December 2020. He has served as Member of the Perak State Legislative Assembly (MLA) for Rungkup since May 2013. He is a member of the United Malays National Organisation (UMNO), a component party of the federal ruling BN coalition which is aligned with also the federal ruling PN coalition at the federal and state levels.

Election results

Honours 
  :
  Companion Class II of the Order of Malacca (DPSM) – Datuk (2011)
  :
  Knight of the Order of Cura Si Manja Kini (DPCM) – Dato' (2015)

References

Living people
People from Perak
Malaysian people of Malay descent
Malaysian Muslims
United Malays National Organisation politicians
Members of the Perak State Legislative Assembly
Perak state executive councillors
21st-century Malaysian politicians
Year of birth missing (living people)